The Qaf-Buall mine is a large mine located in central Albania in Dibër County,  east of the capital, Tirana. Qaf-Buall represents one of the largest chromium reserve in Albania and one of the largest in Europe having estimated reserves of 1.5 million tonnes of ore grading 39.44% chromium metal.

The Qaf-Buall mine began operating in 1983. Between 1983 and 1985 it produced chromium ore only from occurrences. In 1989 production from the mine started. The total combined chromium ore production from the mine between 1989 and 2006 amounted to 6,000 tonnes. The chromium ore reserves of the mine are split into two categories above and below Level +420. The proven ore reserves located above the Level +420 amount to 1,500,000 tonnes of ore grading 39.44% chromium metal. The proven ore reserves located below the Level +420 are currently not estimated or calculated but are expected to be grading over 40% chromium metal. The mine's total reserves amount to 1.5 million tonnes of ore grading 39.44% chromium metal. Since 2006 the mine is unoccupied and no economic activity is recorded at the site. The Qaf-Buall mine is one of the eight Albanian chromium mines to have reserves of over 1 million tonnes of chromium ore.

References 

Chromium mines in Albania
Underground mines in Albania
Bulqizë